The Perdana Putra is a building in Putrajaya, Malaysia which houses the office complex of the Prime Minister of Malaysia. Located on the main hill in Putrajaya, it has become synonymous with the executive branch of the Malaysian federal government.

History 

Construction began in 1997 and was completed in early 1999. The building was first occupied in April 1999 after all sections of the Prime Minister's Department moved from Kuala Lumpur to Putrajaya.

Architecture 

The structural design is influenced by Malay, Islamic and European cultures as such Palladian and Neoclassicism. It was designed by an aQidea Architect (Ahmad Rozi Abd Wahab being the principal architect) with inspiration from the 4th, 7th and former Prime Minister, Mahathir Mohamad.

Interior of the building 

These are the main rooms and halls in the interior layout of Perdana Putra.

Prime Minister's office
Deputy Prime Minister office
Small Meeting Hall
Large Meeting Hall
View point
Delegation room
VIP room
VIP banquet hall
National Security Division office
National Economic Action Council office

See also 
Putrajaya
Malaysian Houses of Parliament, federal government legislative building in Kuala Lumpur.

References

External links 
Tourism Malaysia - Perdana Putra

Buildings and structures in Putrajaya
Buildings and structures completed in 1999
1999 establishments in Malaysia
Government buildings in Malaysia
20th-century architecture in Malaysia